Walid Benmbarek (born 25 January 1980) is a Dutch actor. His father is of Moroccan and French descent and his mother is of Moroccan/Tunisian descent . Benmbarek is best known for his role as "Mohammed Aydin" in soap opera GTST. And as "Adil" in the hitserie Mocro Maffia. Benmbarek has a degree in aerospace engineering.

Acting career
2019 De Luizenmoeder
2018–present Mocro Maffia
2017 Brothers
2008 Flikken Maastricht
2008 Hitte/Harara
2006–08 Goede tijden, slechte tijden (Good times, bad times)
2007 Dennis P.
2006 Kruistocht in spijkerbroek (Crusade in Jeans)
2006 Afblijven (XTC Just Don't Do It)
2006 Shouf, Shouf
2005 Staatsgevaarlijk (Subversive)
2004 Bitches
2003 Loverboy

References

External links

1980 births
Living people
Dutch male actors
Dutch people of French descent
Dutch people of Moroccan descent
Dutch people of Tunisian descent